is a passenger railway station located in the city of Ōzu, Ehime Prefecture, Japan. It is operated by JR Shikoku and has the station number "U13".

Lines
Although Niiya Station is officially on the Uchiko Line, JR Shikoku runs it operationally as part of Yosan Line and as such it only carries the "U" prefix common to other Yosan line stations. Only local trains stop at the station. Connections with other services are needed to travel further east of Matsuyama or further west of Iyo-Ōzu/Yawatahama on the line.

Layout
The station consists of two opposed side platforms serving two tracks. There is no station building but both platforms have shelters for waiting passengers. Steps lead up to the platforms from access roads on either side. There is no means to cross from one platform to the other within the station premises. A road level crossing some distance away must be used.

History
On October 6, 1935, after the track had been re-gauged to 1,067 mm, the station became part of the Uchiko Line. The track at Niiya was re-aligned and the position of the station moved. The new station reopened on 3 March 1986. It was still designated as a station on the Uchiko Line but was now operated as part of the Yosan Line. With the privatization of JNR on 1 April 1987, control of the station passed to JR Shikoku.

Surrounding area
Teikyo Fifth High School
Ozu Municipal Niiya Junior High School
Ozu Municipal Niiya Elementary School (Niiya Jin'ya)

See also
 List of railway stations in Japan

References

External links
Station timetable

Railway stations in Ehime Prefecture
Railway stations in Japan opened in 1920
Ōzu, Ehime